Rodolfo Erazo Santos (born 13 February 1946) is a Honduran long-distance runner. He competed in the men's 10,000 metres at the 1968 Summer Olympics.

References

1946 births
Living people
Athletes (track and field) at the 1968 Summer Olympics
Honduran male long-distance runners
Olympic athletes of Honduras
Place of birth missing (living people)